Luciano Calosso (Rome, 23 October 1953) is an Italian costume designer. In 1981, he received the Best Costume Designer Award at David di Donatello for Fontamara.

Filmography
 Il giustiziere di mezzogiorno (1975)
 Noi non siamo angeli (1977)
 Fontamara (1980)
 Aiutami a sognare (1981)
 Honey (1981)
 La neve nel bicchiere (1986)
 I protagonisti di Fellini (1984)
 The Jeweller's Shop (1989)
 Il lungo viaggio (1987)
 Un poliziotto in città (1988)
 Il prato delle volpi (1989)
 The Wicked (1991)
 Sindrome veneziana (1991)
 Favola crudele (1991)
 Frate Julianus (TV series)  (1991)
 Berlino '39 (1993)
 Stato d'emergenza (1992)
 Delitto passionale (1994)
 Caccia alle mosche (1993)
 Una sola debole voce (1999)
 Sos laribiancos - I dimenticati (2001)

References

External links 

1953 births
Italian costume designers
Living people